Qeshlaq-e Khurasha-ye Olya (also Romanized as Qeshlāq-e Khūrāshā' -ye ‘Olyā; also known as Qeshlāq-e Khūrāshā and Rūstā-ye Faşlī-ye Qeshlāq-e Khūrāshā-ye Bālā) is a village in Dizmar-e Markazi Rural District, Kharvana District, Varzaqan County, East Azerbaijan Province, Iran. At the 2006 census, its population was 44, in 11 families.

References 

Towns and villages in Varzaqan County